Vadi may refer to:

People
 Vadi (surname), list of people with the surname
 Fillipo Vadi, author of the Italian treatise on fighting De Arte Gladiatoria Dimicandi

Other uses
 Vadi (music), a musical note in Indian classical music
 Vadi (valley), an Arabic term for valley or a dry riverbed
 Vadi, Estonia, a village in Estonia
 Wade (folklore) (Norse: Vaði), a Germanic mythological character

See also
 Wadi (disambiguation)